The Kenyan cricket team toured Zimbabwe from 7 to 18 October 2009. They played five One Day Internationals against the full Zimbabwe team and an Intercontinental Cup match against a Zimbabwe XI.

Squads

Intercontinental Cup Match

ODI series

1st ODI

2nd ODI

3rd ODI

4th ODI

5th ODI

References

External links
 Series home at ESPN Cricinfo

2009–10 Zimbabwean cricket season
International cricket competitions in 2009–10
2009-10